Hairenik ( meaning "fatherland") is an Armenian language weekly newspaper published by the Hairenik Association in Watertown, Massachusetts in the United States.

The newspaper, serving the Armenian American community, was established as a weekly in on May 1, 1899, in New York making it one of the longest-running Armenian publications. It moved to Boston, Massachusetts in 1900, then to Watertown in 1986.

In June 1913, it started publishing once every two days, and in December 1915, it became a daily newspaper, with continuous publication as such until 1991, when it was reduced to weekly publication due to declining readership.

It has had the involvement of prominent Armenian national figures as editors such as Arshak Vramian (1900–1907), Siamanto (1909–1911), Simon Vratsian (1911–1914), and Rouben Darbinian (1922–1968).

Hairenik published early stories by William Saroyan, such as "The Broken Wheel" (1933), written under the pen name "Sirak Goryan".

Other Hairenik Association publications
Hairenik Association Inc. has also published :
Hairenik Monthly, from 1922 to 1967
Hairenik Quarterly, from 1968 to 1971
Armenian Weekly, an English language publication since 1934.
The Armenian Review, an English language publication

See also
Armenian Review

References

External links
Hayrenik Weekly official website

Newspapers published in Massachusetts
Armenian-language newspapers
Mass media in Armenia
Newspapers established in 1899
Armenian-American culture in Massachusetts
Watertown, Massachusetts
1899 establishments in Massachusetts